Kallangur is a suburb in the Moreton Bay Region, Queensland, Australia.

Geography
The North Coast railway line forms the western boundary of the suburb, while the Bruce Highway forms the eastern boundary.  The main thoroughfare in Kallangur is route 71, Anzac Avenue.

The Redcliffe Peninsula railway line passes through the suburb, which is served by the Kallangur railway station.

The proposed Bruce Highway Western Alternative will have its southern entry point in Kallangur.

History
The area once belonged to Mrs. Griffin of Whiteside west of Petrie, and was acquired by the son of a Scottish migrant by the name of Thomas Petrie in 1855. The name Kallangur originates from the Indigenous Australian word kalangoor, meaning a goodly or satisfactory place. Kallangur is situated in the Yugarabul traditional Indigenous Australian country of the Brisbane and surrounding regions, however, the word kalangoor is from the Kabi dialect, from the traditional Indigenous Australian Gubbi Gubbi (Kabi) country of the Sunshine Coast and surrounding regions.

Gympie Road (now Old Gympie Road) passed through Kallangur from Brisbane to Gympie. It was a route travelled by Cobb & Co coaches.

Kallangur grew in the early twentieth century as it was on the main road route to the Redcliffe peninsula before the construction of the Hornibrook Bridge in the 1930s.

Kallangur State School opened on 9 June 1930.

More recent development has been in response to the general housing demand in the northern growth corridor.

Dakabin State School opened on 28 January 1992.

St Peter's Anglican church was closed on 7 March 1993 under the authority of Assistant Bishop Wood.

An ANZAC memorial gate was erected along with a bronze statue on the corner of Anzac Avenue and Goodfellows Road. The new Memorial Gardens was unveiled in front of the North's Leagues and Services Club in 2005 by the former Minister for Veterans' Affairs De-Anne Kelly.

The median age of the Kallangur population was 33 years, 4 years below the national median of 37.  77.9% of people living in Kallangur were born in Australia. The other top responses for country of birth were New Zealand 5.9%, England 4%, Philippines 0.7%, South Africa 0.7%, Scotland 0.5%.  90.9% of people spoke only English at home; the next most common languages were 0.6% Samoan, 0.4% Hindi, 0.4% Spanish, 0.3% Tagalog, 0.3% German.

Kallangur railway station was completed in 2016.

Pinnacle Academic College opened in July 2020.

Heritage listings 

Kallangur has a number of heritage-listed sites, including:
 Anzac Avenue (the road itself)
 1347 Anzac Avenue: Strathpine Honour Board

Education
Kallangur State School is a government primary (Prep-6) school for boys and girls at 139 School Road. In 2018, the school had an enrolment of 810 students with 55 teachers (50 full-time equivalent) and 39 non-teaching staff (27 full-time equivalent). It includes a special education program.

Despite its name, Dakabin State School is a government primary (Prep-6) school for boys and girls at Sheaves Road in Kallangur. In 2018, the school had an enrolment of 600 students with 45 teachers (39 full-time equivalent) and 34 non-teaching staff (21 full-time equivalent). It includes a special education program. It also includes the POWER Positive Learning Centre, a specific-purpose primary (3-7) program for children whose behaviours are incompatible with mainstream schooling; the aim of the centre is to ultimately re-integrate the child back into mainstream schooling.

Charlotte Mason College is a private primary and secondary (Prep-10) school for boys and girls at 30 Narangba Road. In 2018, the school had an enrolment of 214 students with 9 teachers (7 full-time equivalent) and 7 non-teaching staff. The school also operates a distance education program.

Pinnacle Academic College is a private primary school (Prep-6) for boys and girls at the same site as Charlotte Mason College but at the other end of the site. It offers individualised self-directed education.

There is no government secondary school in Kallangur. The nearest government secondary schools are Dakabin State High School in neighbouring Dakabin to the north and Murrumba State Secondary College in neighbouring Murrumba Downs to the south.

Amenities
The Kallangur branch of the Queensland Country Women's Association meets at 1431 Anzac Avenue.

References

External links

 

 
Suburbs of Moreton Bay Region